Christopher Reed (born July 22, 1992) is an American football guard for the Minnesota Vikings of the National Football League (NFL). He was signed as an undrafted free agent by the Jacksonville Jaguars after the 2015 NFL Draft. He played college football at Minnesota State. He has also been a member of the Miami Dolphins and Carolina Panthers.

College career
Reed attended Minnesota State University where he played as a left tackle for the Minnesota State football team. In addition to playing football, Reed was also a thrower on the school's track and field team. While on the track and field team, Reed, was an 11-time NCAA Division II Track & Field All-American and the NCAA DII outdoor shot put champion in both 2013 and 2014. He also holds school records in the indoor and outdoor shot put, as well as, the indoor weight throw and outdoor hammer throw.

Professional career

Jacksonville Jaguars
Following the 2015 NFL Draft, Reed was signed by the Jacksonville Jaguars as an undrafted free agent. He was on the team's practice squad during the 2015 season. He made the team's 53-man roster on September 3, 2016. He played in 10 games with four starts before being placed on injured reserve on December 23, 2016, with a toe injury.

On September 2, 2017, Reed was waived by the Jaguars and signed to the practice squad the next day. He was promoted to the active roster on October 7, 2017. He played in six games in 2017, starting three at left guard in place of the injured Patrick Omameh.

Miami Dolphins
On March 18, 2019, Reed signed with the Miami Dolphins. He played in five games before being waived on December 4, 2019.

Carolina Panthers
On December 5, 2019, Reed was claimed off waivers by the Carolina Panthers. He was placed on the reserve/COVID-19 list by the team on September 1, 2020. He was activated on September 23.

Indianapolis Colts
Reed signed with the Indianapolis Colts on April 1, 2021.

Minnesota Vikings
Reed signed with the Minnesota Vikings on April 1, 2022.

NFL career statistics

References

External links
Jacksonville Jaguars bio
Minnesota State Mavericks bio

1992 births
Living people
American football offensive guards
American male hammer throwers
American male shot putters
American strength athletes
Carolina Panthers players
Indianapolis Colts players
Jacksonville Jaguars players
Miami Dolphins players
Minnesota State Mavericks football players
Players of American football from Nebraska
Sportspeople from Omaha, Nebraska
Track and field athletes from Nebraska
Track and field athletes in the National Football League
Omaha Central High School alumni
Minnesota Vikings players
Minnesota State University, Mankato alumni